Tritax EuroBox plc is a property company investing in distribution centres across Europe. It is listed on the London Stock Exchange and is a constituent of the FTSE 250 Index.

History
The company is managed by Tritax, a property management business, formed in 1995. It was the subject of an initial public offering raising £300 million in July 2018. It raised a further £170 million in September 2021.

Operations
The company owns, on behalf of its lessees, distribution centres across Europe the most significant of which is a large facility for the Spanish retailer, Mango, in Barcelona. The company's portfolio was valued at £1.8 billion as at 30 September 2022.

References

External links

British companies established in 2018
Property companies of the United Kingdom
Companies based in London
Companies listed on the London Stock Exchange